The Youth Olympics are a multi-sport event organized by the International Olympic Committee (IOC) every two years, alternating between Summer Youth Olympics and Winter Youth Olympics. Selection of the host city is done by postal voting by the members of the IOC four to five years prior to the tournament, in which the IOC members vote between candidate cities which have submitted bids. Bids for the first four games have been made by 15 cities in 14 countries.

The bid process consists of two rounds. First, cities and national Olympic committees (NOCs) may show their interest and submit a preliminary bid, becoming applicant cities. Through analysis of the questionnaires, the IOC gave a weighted-average score to each city based on the scores obtained in each of the questionnaire's eleven themes: political and social support, general infrastructure, sports venues, Olympic Village, environment, accommodation, transport, security, past experience, finance, and legacy. IOC's executive committee then selects a short-list of candidate cities. The candidate cities are investigated by the IOC Evaluation Committee, who make an evaluation report. These submit a more extensive bid book and are subject to additional evaluation, which is presented to the IOC members. Voting occurs as an exhaustive ballot by mail, which may occur through multiple rounds until a single city holds a majority of the votes. IOC members from a candidate NOC may not vote in any round while their country remains in the election. The first two selections were done by postal votes; since the selection for the 2014 Games, voting has been done at an IOC Session.

Summer Youth Olympic Games
The following is a list of bids for the Summer Youth Olympics, sorted by year. It consists of the year the games were held or scheduled to be held, the date the decision was made, the city and country which issued the bid, and the result of the bid parties. The bid listed first for each games is the one selected by the IOC.

Winter Youth Olympic Games
The following is a list of bids for the Winter Youth Olympics, sorted by year. It consists of the year the games were held or scheduled to be held, the date the decision was made, the city and country which issued the bid, and the result of the bid parties. The bid listed first for each games is the one selected by the IOC.

Bidding cities
The following is a list of bids submitted by city. It lists the national Olympic committee, the city, and the games for which failed and successful bid were submitted.

Notes

References

 
Olympic Youth bids
Youth Olympics
Bids Youth